Mammon is a term from the Christian Bible used to describe material wealth or greed, often personified. 

Mammon may also refer to:

Fictional characters
Mammon (comics), an antagonist in the Spawn comic book series
Mammon (Dungeons & Dragons), a devil in the Dungeons & Dragons role-playing game
Mammon, a Hai-Genti in the 2006 video game Maelstrom
Mammon, an antagonist in the Reborn! anime and manga series

Literature
Mammon, or The Hardships of an Heiress, an 1855 novel by Catherine Gore
Mammon, a novel by Maud Howe Elliott
Mammon, Robot Born of Woman, a comedic play by Robert Llewellyn
Mammon Inc., a 2003 novel by Hwee Hwee Tan
Mammon, or Microsoft Internet Explorer, a character in The Book of Mozilla
Mammon, "morals and dogma" by Albert Pike

Other uses
Mammon, an 1885 painting by George Frederic Watts
"Mammon", a song by Quasi from Early Recordings
"Mammon", a song by Todd Rundgren from Liars
"Mammon", an episode of Law & Order
"Mammon", a Norwegian TV series broadcast by NRK